Wen of Jin may refer to:

Marquis Wen of Jin (805–746 BC)
Duke Wen of Jin (697–628 BC)
Sima Zhao (211–265), posthumously Emperor Wen of Jin